65mm  may refer to:

 Cannone da 65/17 modello 13, an Italian artillery piece.
 Canon de 65 M(montagne) modele 1906, a French mountain artillery piece, also used by the Germans under the name "6.5 cm Gebirgskanone 221(f)"
 70 mm film